Alberto y Los Trios Paraguayos was a trio from Paraguay formed by Luis Alberto del Paraná, with Digno García (1919–1984) and Agustín Barboza. They toured the UK in the late 1950s and early 1960s, and released a number of UK records in the 1960s. The band leader, del Paraná, died in England in 1974.

The comedy rock band, Alberto y Lost Trios Paranoias, from the 1970s took their name from a satirical version of this band's name.

See also
Los Paraguayos

External links
 Selected discography
 Artist page on Paraguayan music site

Paraguayan musical groups